The Wake is the second studio album by British neo-progressive rock band IQ, released in June 1985 by Sahara Records. Recorded at Falconer Studios in London from March to April 1985, it was produced by Mike Holmes and Tim Esau.

Release and reception

The Wake is IQ's only album to reach the UK Charts, peaking at number 72 with a stay of one week.

The Wake has been described by AllMusic as "definitely a classic" which "helped define what neo-progressive was and generated dozens of sound-alike albums." The review argued that it "remains the band's true classic, a must-have for anyone remotely interested in progressive rock from the 1980s."

Sleeve art

The cover art was designed by lead singer Peter Nicholls. In the image, most of the characters are original, except the central one, which is based on Canadian actress Rae Dawn Chong wearing clay face paint as Ika in the film Quest for Fire (1981). However, according to Nicholls, many fans of the band misinterpreted this as a self-portrait, since he wore extensive stage makeup at the time.

In what is thought to be the earliest photograph ever taken of the band Radiohead, a poster of The Wake is shown on the wall behind Thom Yorke at Abingdon School.

Track listing

Personnel

IQ
Peter Nicholls – vocals and tambourine; design and illustration
Mike Holmes – guitars; production
Tim Esau – bass; production
Martin Orford – synthesizer, organ, Mellotron, flute and backing vocals
Paul Cook – drums and percussion

Technical personnel
Harun Coombes – engineer
George Bodnar – cover photography

Charts

References

External links
IQ Official Website

IQ (band) albums
1985 albums